The Grand Army of the Republic Hall, also known as Booth Post No. 130, is an historic Carpenter Gothic building in Grand Meadow, Minnesota, United States. The hall was built in 1891 and on June 13, 1986, it was added to the National Register of Historic Places.  It was nominated for being a rare surviving example of an inexpensive pattern clubhouse and one of Minnesota's only two remaining Grand Army of the Republic halls.

The hall was the meeting place of the Booth Post No. 130, which was one of 192 Grand Army of the Republic (G.A.R.) posts in Minnesota.  The hall is now vacant.

References

External links

1891 establishments in Minnesota
Buildings and structures in Mower County, Minnesota
Carpenter Gothic architecture in Minnesota
Clubhouses on the National Register of Historic Places in Minnesota
Minnesota
Minnesota in the American Civil War
Museums in Mower County, Minnesota
National Register of Historic Places in Mower County, Minnesota